John "Willie" Wilcox (born September 21, 1951, in Trenton, New Jersey) is an American drummer, vocalist, producer, recording engineer, sound designer, composer and senior audio director. He is best known for being a member of the band Utopia. He also has been the senior audio director for Bally Technologies and Scientific Games in Las Vegas, Nevada from 2010 to 2020.

Biography 
Born in Trenton New Jersey in 1951, Willie was first inspired by his father who was a trombone and bass player. Willie would watch his dad playing concerts in the park and fondly remembers the feeling of going up on stage after the band’s performance and watch all the musicians packing up their instruments. There seemed to be something magical about being on that stage and at 10 years of age Willie was hooked!

He would go on to study drums and percussion as a teenager in Glens Falls NY at the local drum shop, “Freddy’s.” He worked in the drum shop cleaning and repairing Ludwig drum kits, studying & eventually teaching. It was here that he attended drum clinics with Max Roach, Gene Krupa, Ludwig’s Joe Morello and Mel Taylor of the “Ventures.” Teo Macero, producer of many of the Miles Davis records lived in Glens Falls and had an Italian restaurant there called “Maceros.” Teo invited the big-bands to play there as a favor to him on their way to their way to their Montreal gigs from New York. Wille sat in the front row as a 16-year-old kid watching Count Basie, Woody Herman, Duke Ellington, Max Roach and Gene Krupa playing live! Willie was the intermission entertainment between the band’s sets playing drums lives along with Freddie Hubbard and John Coltrane records on a huge stereo system behind the bar.

He got to meet and mingle with his big band and drumming idols and one night was asked by Gene to sit in with his band further cementing Willie’s career path into the drumming world.

Willie graduated high school winning a scholarship to the Berklee School of Music performing a percussion piece with a resident pianist and composer Dr. Maurice Whitney. The piece they performed was by the French composer “Darius Milhaud” titled: “Concerto for percussion and small orchestra.” It featured timpani, marimba, suspended bass drum, triangles, ratchets and multiple percussion instruments. This was a piece that was normally performed by college graduates as their final performance piece for graduation at schools like Julliard and Manhattan School of Music.

Willie completed a year at Berklee School of Music and quickly transferred to Manhattan School of Music in NYC.

While in New York Willie studied drums with legendary jazz drum instructor Jim Blackley. He played at the playboy club and also played the big band mountain circuit playing live shows in the Catskills for the classic acts while attending college.

During his last year at Manhattan School of Music Willie auditioned for the Daryl Hall and John Oates band. They were preparing to tour their new record “Abandon Luncheonette” featuring the hit song “She’s Gone”. Willie aced the audition and went on to tour extensively with Daryl and John opening for artists like Lou Reed, The Bee Gees and Dr. John. This would be the beginning of his rock music drumming career. The next landmark opportunity brought the recording of the record “War Babies” with Hall and Oates. This would be Willie’s first meeting with Todd Rundgren who would become a life long musical collaboration with Willie in the band “Utopia.”

Willie took a gig with Bette Midler playing the show “Clams on The Half Shell” and performed on Broadway for six months at the Minskoff Theatre. This was a big band gig and also starred legendary vibes player “Lionel Hampton” and legendary bass player “Gerald Jemott,” Aretha Franklin’s long time bass player.

It was just after this six-month period that Willie was asked to join “Utopia” with Todd Rundgren. This would become a 25-year collaboration recording some 25 records, and participating in multiple U.S and world tours.

During this time period, Willie also played drums on albums for Meat Loaf ”Bat Out of Hell,” Todd Rundgren  solo records, Shaun Cassidy and Steve Hillage. Other live and studio projects also included Mick Jagger and Ringo Starr.

Willie had a significant song writing career composing and producing songs with artists like Luther Vandross, The Pointer Sisters, Natalie Cole, Kylie Minogue, Hall and Oates, Meat Loaf, Manny Pacquiao and scoring a #1 hit with dance artist Stacy Q, “We Connect.”

Willie would continue his production and composing career at NBC Universal Television writing theme songs for shows like Jim Cramer’s “Mad Money.”

He has spent the last 10 years as the senior audio director at the largest gaming companies in the world, Bally Technologies and Scientific Games where he produced and remixed all the original tracks from Michael’s hits for the Michael Jackson games in 5.1 surround sound.

Equipment

Throughout his career with Utopia, Wilcox has been photographed playing drumsets by Sonor, Yamaha Recording Series, Leedy and Ludwig, and is currently endorsed by Ludwig Drum Company.

Wilcox's most memorable drumset was a motorcycle-shaped electronic percussion configuration nicknamed "Trapparatus". It consisted of pads and pedals which triggered electronic percussion sounds, mounted on an actual motorcycle frame and topped with conventional cymbals. Wilcox can be seen playing the Trapparatus in early '80s Utopia concerts, as well as an appearance on The Mike Douglas Show. According to Utopia keyboardist Roger Powell, the Trapparatus was destroyed in 1986 when a warehouse containing most of Utopia's touring equipment was set ablaze by arsonists.

In the early 1980s he became an endorser of Sonor drums, and is seen playing a Sonor Signature drumset in Utopia's concert videos An Evening With Utopia and Live In Boston 1982. Early in his career Wilcox played Zildjian cymbals, switching to Sabian cymbals in the mid-1980s.

As of 2017 Wilcox played a 4-piece Sonor Delite drumset with Sabian cymbals, Remo drumheads and Vic Firth drumsticks.

For the 2018 Utopia reunion, Wilcox announced that he was returning to the Ludwig Drum Company, and played a turquoise sparkle kit on the tour. This kit appears with the band on their July 2018 performance on the Jimmy Kimmel Show.

Discography

 Daryl Hall and John Oates “War Babies” (1974 Atlantic Records)
 Todd Rundgren “Initiation” (1975 Bearsville Records)
 Todd Rundgren and Utopia “Live at The Hammersmith Odeon ’75” (1975 Shout Factory)
 Daryl Hall and John Oates “No Goodbyes” (1977 Atlantic Records)
 Dan Hartman “Images” (1976 Blue Sky Records)
 Steve Hillage “L” (1976, CBS Records)
 Utopia “Ra “ (1977, Bearsville Records)
 Utopia Oops! Wrong Planet”  (1977) 
 Meat Loaf “Bat Out of Hell “ (1977, Cleveland International Records)
 Todd Rundgren “Back To The Bars” (1978 Bearsville Records)
 Shaun Cassidy “Wasp”  (1980, Warner Bros.)
 Candi and the Back Beat “Good Together” (1980 I.R.S. Records)
 Utopia “Adventures in Utopia”  (1980, Bearsville Records)
 Utopia “Deface the Music”  (1980, Bearsville Records)
 Utopia “Swing to the Right “ (1982, Bearsville Records)
 David Lasley “Missing Twenty Grand” (Emi Records 1982)
 Utopia “Utopia “ (1982, Network Records)
 The Rubinoos “Party of Two” (1983, Berserkly Records)
 Todd Rundgren and Utopia ”One World” DVD (1983 Toei Video)
 Utopia “Oblivion” (1984, Passport Records)
 Utopia “POV”  (1985, Passport Records)
 Stacey Q “We Connect” (single) (1986 Atlantic Records)
 Stacey Q “Better than Heaven” (LP) (1986 Atlantic Records)
 Utopia “Trivia” (1987, Gem Records)
 Brian Briggs “Brain Damage (1988 Bearsville Records
 Gregory Hines “I’m Gonna Get To You” (1988 Epic Records)
 James Young “Out On A Day Pass” (1988 Full Blast Records)
 Rory Block “Turning Point” (1989 Zensor)
 Utopia “Anthology”  (1989 Rhino Records)
 Utopia “Redux '92: Live in Japan”  (1992 BMG)
 Utopia “Oblivion, POV & Some Trivia”  (1996)
 Utopia “Official Bootleg Tokyo '79 “ (1999)
 Utopia Live in Boston: 1982 DVD Utopia (2004)
 Utopia “Live at The Waldorf” (2015 Esoteric Records)        
 Utopia “Live At The Chicago Theatre” DVD (2018 Cleopatra Records)

References

Living people
American drummers
Utopia (American band) members
1951 births